"Los Infieles" is Aventura's first single from their second live album K.O.B. Live (2006). The song reached at the top five of Hot Latin Tracks peaking at #4 on the Billboard Hot Latin Tracks. There is also a remix for the song featuring Mexican singer Frankie J.

Music video
The music video for "Los Infieles" is Aventura is in a club when they each meet four hot girls. They all have girlfriends, and the girls have boyfriends, but that doesn't stop them from hooking up. The girl Romeo is with gets a phone call at 2:30 in the morning from her boyfriend asking where is she at. She tells him she's running late.

Charts

Weekly charts

Year-end charts

Awards and nominations
"Los Infieles" received an award at the 2007 Latin Billboard Award for "Tropical Airplay Song of the Year" by Duo or Group. The song also received a nomination at the Premio Lo Nuestro 2008 for "Tropical Song of the Year" which it lost to their own song, "Mi Corazoncito".

References

2006 singles
Aventura (band) songs
Frankie J songs
Music videos directed by Jessy Terrero
Songs written by Romeo Santos
Songs written by Tainy
Songs about infidelity